Degeberga is a locality situated in Kristianstad Municipality, Skåne County, Sweden with 1,291 inhabitants in 2010. It is located approximately 22 km (14 mi) south of the city of Kristianstad. The area is known for the highest waterfall in Scania, located in the nearby Forsakar Nature Reserve.

An outdoor pool named Forsakarsbadet, which is open to visitors during the summer (between mid-June and mid-August), is situated in a valley just next to the nature reserve.

References 

Populated places in Kristianstad Municipality
Populated places in Skåne County